Bransgrove is a surname. Notable people with the surname include:

James Bransgrove (born 1995), English footballer
Peter Bransgrove (1914–1966), English architect
Rod Bransgrove (born  1950), English businessman and cricket administrator